The Binary Café was an internet cafe which was located upstairs at 502 Yonge Street in Toronto, Ontario from approximately June 1994 through December 1994. It is significant in that it was Canada's first internet cafe. It was run by Steve Bernhardson and staffed by a handful of employees/volunteers.

The full name of the establishment was actually The Binary Café and Hexadecimal Emporium, a name which reflected the two main components of the space—serving food and drinks, and selling cyberpunk-related books, magazines, and zines.

Internet access was available through two x86 computers, which shared a single
telephone line for their PPP connection.

References

External links
 
 Ode to The Binary Cafe... -- a web memorial

Culture of Toronto
Internet cafés